Abozaki Station (阿母崎駅, Abozaki-eki) is a train station located in Azuma-chō, Unzen, Nagasaki. The station is serviced by Shimabara Railway and is a part of the Shimabara Railway Line.

Lines 
The train station is serving for the Shimabara Railway Line with the local trains stop at the station.

Adjacent stations 

|-
|colspan=5 style="text-align:center;" |Shimabara Railway

See also 
 List of railway stations in Japan

References

External links 
 

Railway stations in Japan opened in 1955
Railway stations in Nagasaki Prefecture
Stations of Shimabara Railway